Sonny Arguinzoni is an American Evangelical Christian pastor, author and youth counselor who founded Victory Outreach International, an international ministry of Evangelical Christian Churches.  Since its founding, Victory Outreach has grown throughout the United States and in over 33 countries.

Early life 
Arguinzoni was born in 1939 in New York City to a family of Puerto Rican descent.  According to Arguinzoni , while growing up in Brooklyn, he began associating with the local Viceroy gang and began abusing heroin and other drugs.

In 1960 at age 21,  Arguinzoni befriended Nicky Cruz,.at a Teen Challenge in Brooklyn.  He credits Cruz with influencing him to become a born again Christian. While attending the Latin American Bible College,  Arguinzoni  met his future wife Julie.  After marrying, the couple moved to Los Angeles,

The couple began to minister to individuals in the  Aliso Village area who were involved in street gangs and drug abuse.  In 1967, after using their house for meetings, Arguinzoni and Julie founded Victory Outreach in a small building in the Boyle Heights neighborhood in East Los Angeles.  The ministry grew throughout different cities in California. During the 1980s, the ministry experienced a rapid growth throughout the United States, which precluded an international expansion in the 1990s and moving forward.

Victory Outreach International 
Victory Outreach consists of over 700 churches.

References

External links

1939 births
Living people
21st-century American writers
American evangelicals
American religious leaders